Jessica Schram (born January 15, 1986) is an American actress, model and singer. Her most notable roles include Hannah Griffith in Veronica Mars, Rachel Seybolt in Life, Karen Nadler in Falling Skies and Cinderella/Ashley Boyd in Once Upon a Time.

Early life
Jessica Schram was born in Skokie, Illinois to John and Kristie Schram. She was raised in Buffalo Grove, Illinois and graduated from Buffalo Grove High School in 2004. Schram modeled and appeared in television commercials as a child, and began performing in musical theatre at age 12. Schram moved to Los Angeles after graduation to pursue a career in acting.

Career 

Early in her career, she appeared in television commercials for Retin-A Micro and Kentucky Fried Chicken. Her first on-screen appearance was a role as Larissa in the episode "Number One Fan" of Nickelodeon's sitcom Drake & Josh. In 2005, she played Susan Davis on Hallmark Channel's Jane Doe series of television movies. She also appeared in four episodes of the television series Veronica Mars as Hannah Griffith, who becomes Logan Echolls' girlfriend. She has appeared in several guest starring television roles, including CSI: Miami, Without a Trace, House, Ghost Whisperer, Medium, The Mentalist and Boston Legal.

In 2008, she starred in the drama film Keith and appeared as Tracy in the comedy film American Pie Presents: The Naked Mile (2006). She was featured on Maxim magazine's website in their "Today's Girl" feature. In 2009, she was featured in a music video for J. R. Richards' song "A Beautiful End". Schram appeared in Tony Scott's action thriller film Unstoppable (2010), playing Darcy, the estranged wife of Chris Pine's character.

In 2011, Schram joined the main cast for the first season of the TNT science-fiction series Falling Skies. Her character was reduced to a recurring role in seasons two and three, then to guest appearances in season four. Between 2011 and 2016, Schram appeared in four episodes of the television series Once Upon a Time, playing Cinderella/Ashley Boyd. She reprised the role in the 2013 premiere of Once Upon A Time In Wonderland.

In 2012, she portrayed Christine Kendal on ABC's military drama series Last Resort. In 2015, Schram portrayed Cash Gray in the fourth season of musical drama series Nashville. She landed a role as Jennifer in crime thriller film Shot Caller (2017), which received generally positive reviews from critics. In December 2019, Schram was cast as Dr. Hannah Asher on the NBC's drama series Chicago Med Initially a recurring role in the series's fifth season that ended with the sixth season's premiere, she returned in season seven in a series regular capacity.

Schram is also a singer-songwriter and has toured with Chicago blues artist Joan Baby.

Filmography

Television

Film

References

External links 
 

1986 births
21st-century American actresses
Actresses from Chicago
American film actresses
American television actresses
Living people
People from Buffalo Grove, Illinois
People from Skokie, Illinois